"The Surplus" is the tenth episode of the fifth season of the television series The Office, and the show's eighty-second episode overall. The episode aired in the United States on December 4, 2008 on NBC.

In this episode, the office is at odds over whether to spend a budget surplus on new chairs or a new photocopier, with Jim, Pam, and Oscar in particular trying to convince Michael how to spend the money. Meanwhile, Andy and Angela visit Schrute Farms to discuss their wedding plans.

Synopsis
Oscar Martinez (Oscar Nunez) informs Michael Scott (Steve Carell) that the office must spend a $4,300 surplus or lose it in next year's budget, using increasingly simpler terms to explain the situation to Michael. When Michael opens up the floor for suggestions, factions break out and officemates square off against one another in order to get what they want. Oscar suggests that they replace the copier while Pam Beesly (Jenna Fischer) suggests they buy new chairs and Toby Flenderson (Paul Lieberstein) suggests that they get the air quality in the office tested, saying that there is radon coming from downstairs and asbestos coming from the ceiling. Jim Halpert (John Krasinski) takes Oscar's side, much to Pam's shock, because he started making copies himself since he and Pam started dating (asking Pam to make copies makes him feel awkward) and knows how bad the copier is, while the rest of the employees side with Pam. Pam notices the copier malfunctioning when she uses it, but still wants to replace the chairs. Michael does not choose a side, because he does not want to be the bad guy, so both sides start warming up to him to win him over. Jim and Oscar take Michael out for lunch, while Pam puts on more make-up and starts to hit on Michael.

Michael still remains indecisive regarding what to buy, so he brings in a third party: Hank (Hugh Dane) the security guard. However, Hank is more interested in staying in the warm office than making a decision so Michael calls CFO David Wallace (Andy Buckley) to help settle the matter. David informs Michael that he has the option of turning in the surplus, which would result in him getting paid a bonus equal to 15% of it. Michael then tells the employees that he is not going to replace the copier nor the chairs instead opting that they need “nothing”, but Oscar realizes that Michael now knows about the third option (Michael immediately says "645 dollars" when Oscar asks him what 15% of 4300 is but struggles to calculate 15% of 200). Michael becomes indecisive again and, unable to take the employees' intrusive behavior anymore, delegates the decision-making to them, hoping that they will be unable to come to a consensus by the day's end and enable him to take the bonus. The employees quickly decide to have the chairs replaced instead of remaining deadlocked, upsetting Michael. Later, Michael laments that he bought a fur coat in anticipation of receiving the bonus, which had fake blood thrown on it by activists.

Angela Martin (Angela Kinsey) and Andy Bernard (Ed Helms) visit Schrute Farms to discuss wedding plans with Dwight Schrute (Rainn Wilson). Dwight holds a mock wedding in a barn, with Dwight playing Andy and Andy playing Angela's father. An Amish minister who only speaks German plays the minister and performs the mock-ceremony. Dwight goes through the steps of the wedding, putting a ring made of twine on Angela's finger and having them both say "I do" to each other. Angela appears to be very happy with Dwight and tells him that she made a mistake getting together with Andy. Dwight acknowledges her mistake and tells her that the mock wedding was an actual wedding since Andy technically acted as their witness and the supposedly fake minister was actually marrying them in German. He tells her that this was why he allowed her to have her wedding to Andy on his farm, and she angrily storms off. Back in the office, Angela passionately kisses Andy in front of everybody and tells him that she is going into town to take care of a "legal issue".

Throughout the day, Jim and Pam try to get each other to switch sides. Pam gives Jim a scare, telling him that he is on "dangerous ground". Pam is snarky towards Jim during the entire debate, which Jim seems more easygoing about. However, at the end of the episode, Jim gets back at Pam for winning the debate by reverting to his earlier practice of having Pam make copies for him.

Reception
"The Surplus" was voted the eighth highest-rated episode out of 26 from the fifth season, according to an episode poll at the fansite OfficeTally; the episode was rated 8.42 out of 10.

Notes

This episode begins Ryan Howard's 11-episode absence from the office, as he went on vacation. He would return in "Dream Team".

References

External links
"The Surplus" at NBC.com

The Office (American season 5) episodes
2008 American television episodes
Television episodes directed by Paul Feig